Barry John Rowe (born 15 October 1945) is a former Australian politician.

He was born in Melbourne, and attended St Bernard's College in Moonee Ponds and then Monash University, where he received a Bachelor of Economics, and Hawthorn State College, where he received a Diploma of Education. He worked as a personnel officer, and joined the Labor Party in 1969, becoming president of the Moonee Ponds and Strathmore branches. He served on Essendon City Council from 1973 to 1979 and as mayor from 1976 to 1977; he also worked as an economics lecturer at the Royal Melbourne Institute of Technology from 1976 to 1979. In 1979 he was elected to the Victorian Legislative Assembly as the member for Essendon. He was Minister for Agriculture and Rural Affairs from 1989 to 1991 and Minister for Small Business from January to April 1991. In 1992, following a redistribution, he contested Gisborne, but was defeated.

References

1945 births
Living people
Australian Labor Party members of the Parliament of Victoria
Members of the Victorian Legislative Assembly
Monash University alumni
Academic staff of RMIT University
Mayors of places in Victoria (Australia)
Politicians from Melbourne
Victorian Ministers for Agriculture